The University of Science and Technology, Yemen (USTY)  is a non-profit university located in Aden, Yemen. It offers programs that lead to bachelor's, master's, and PhD degrees.

The university is a member of the Association of Arab Universities, Arab Higher Education Institutions, Arab Network for Open and Distance Education, the Federation of the Universities of the Islamic World, the Federation of International Universities, and the International Council for Open and Distance Education (ICDE).

History
The University of Science and Technology Yemen (USTY) was established in 1994 as the National College of Science and Technology as a non-profit private university.

In 1996, the Center for Renewable Energy and Electronic Design was established at the university as a solar energy center.

In 2020, due to the Houthis' prolonged control of the university's headquarters, facilities, and hospital in Sana'a, the university moved its headquarters to the interim capital, Aden.

Branches
 Hadhramout Branch
 Taiz Branch, Al-Medina

Centers
 International Language Center
 University Book Center
 Center for Talent Development
 Medical Education Center
 GIS Center for Training and Research
 Center for Renewable Energy and Electronic Design
 Center for Studies, Research and Engineering Consultations

Faculties
In cooperation with foreign universities, it runs degree programs at undergraduate and graduate levels. Its own academic programs have seen expansion, and it now has eight faculties: 
 Faculty of Medicine and Health Sciences
 Faculty of Engineering and Computing
 Faculty of Humanities and Administrative Sciences
 Deanship of E-Learning and Distance Education
 Deanship of Postgraduate Studies and Scientific Research

Degree programs

Undergraduate programs

Faculty of Medicine and Health Sciences
 Bachelor Degree in Dental Surgery (BDS)
 Bachelor of Pharmacy
 Bachelor of Clinical Nutrition and Dietetics
 Bachelor of Clinical Laboratory Sciences
 Dentistry Technician Diploma
 Pharmacy Technician Diploma
 Medical Laboratory Technician
 Bachelor's degree Doctor of Pharmacy

Faculty of Engineering and Computing
 Bachelor of Civil Engineering
 Bachelor of Architectural Engineering
 Bachelor of Mechatronics
 Bachelor of Engineering Biomedical
 Bachelor of Graphic Design and Multimedia
 Bachelor of Information Technology

Faculty of Administrative and Human Sciences
 Bachelor of Business Administration (Arabic)
 Bachelor of Business Administration (English programme)
 Bachelor of international business management
 Bachelor of Accounting
 Bachelor of Islamic Studies
 Bachelor of English Translation

Deanship of E-Learning and Distance Education
 Bachelor of Quran Sciences
 Bachelor of Islamic Studies
 Bachelor of Public Relations
 Bachelor of Arabic Language
 Bachelor of Sociology
 Bachelor of Psychology
 Bachelor of Multimedia Journalism
 Bachelor of Law
 Bachelor of Multimedia Radio and Television Broadcasting
 Bachelor of Shariah and Law
 Bachelor of Hospital Management
 Bachelor of Marketing and Production Management
 Bachelor of Business Administration
 Bachelor of Human Resources
 Bachelor of Accounting
 Bachelor of Finance and Banking
 Bachelor of International Business and Administration
 Bachelor of History

Postgraduate programs
 Master of Business Administration
 Master of Science in Accounting
 Master of Islamic Studies
 Master of Computing

International programs

College of Islamic Sciences
 Master's/PhD in Sharia (Islamic transactions)
 Master's/PhD in Sharia (Islamic law and the judiciary)
 Master's/PhD in Sharia (usouls and objectives)
 Master's/PhD in Sharia (Islamic management)
 Master's/PhD in Sharia (jurisprudence and contemporary issues)
 Master's/PhD in Sharia (study of manuscripts in the archipelago of jurisprudence and the Malaysian language)
 Master's/PhD in Sharia (jurisprudence of transactions)
 Master's/PhD in Sharia (astronomy studies)
 Master's/PhD on the origins of religion (theology)
 Master's/PhD on the origins of religion (Islamic thought and contemporary ideologies)
 Master's/PhD on the origins of religion (Islamic sufism)
 Master's/PhD on the origins of religion (comparing religions)
 Master's/PhD on the origins of religion (Islamic philosophy)
 Master's/PhD on the origins of Religion (manuscript studies)
 Master's/PhD in Usul al-Din (sufism)
 Master's/PhD in the Islamic call (Islamic call and leadership)
 Master's/PhD in Islamic Da'wah (management and development of Da'wah)
 Master's/PhD in the Islamic call (Dawa and the Ummah)
 Master's/PhD in the Sciences of the Qur'an and Sunnah (Hadith studies)
 Master's/PhD in the Sciences of the Qur'an and Sunnah (Quran studies)
 Master's/PhD in the sciences of the Qur'an and Sunnah (the study of readings)
 Master's/PhD in Islamic studies (Islamic civilization and literature)
 Master's/PhD in Islamic studies (Arabic literature)
 Master's/PhD in Islamic studies (manuscript studies)
 Master's/PhD in Islamic studies (Islamic history)
 Master's/PhD in Islamic studies (study of prominent Islamic personalities)
 Master's/PhD in Islamic studies (translation studies)
 Master's/PhD in Islamic studies (Arabic linguistics)
 Master's/PhD in Islamic studies (linguistics)
 Master's/PhD in teacher education
 Master's/PhD in educational psychology
 Master's/PhD in education management
 Maste and PhD of Education (curriculum and instruction department)
 Maste and PhD of Education (educational administration and administration)
 Maste and PhD of Education (Islamic education)
 Maste and PhD of Education (Arabic language teaching)
 Maste and PhD of Education (Islamic counseling and psychotherapy)
 Master's in education administration

Faculty of Languages and Communication
 Technical Master/PhD in English literature (comparative literature)
 Technical Master/PhD in professional English (English for professional and academic written objectives)
 Technical Master/PhD in professional English (English for professional communication)
 Technical Master/PhD in linguistics (syntax linguistics)
 Technical Master/PhD in linguistics (semantics, pragmatics, and phraseology)
 Technical Master/PhD in teaching English (reading assessments)
 Technical Master/PhD in teaching English (assessment of pedagogy)
 Technical Master/PhD in teaching English (educational technology)
 Technical Master/PhD in teaching English (language literature)
 Technical Master/PhD in applied linguistics (contemporary discourse/teacher education and professional development)
 Technical Master/PhD in applied linguistics (linguistic error analysis)
 Technical Master/PhD in applied linguistics (Sociolinguistics and discourse analysis)
 Technical Master/PhD in Arabic literature (Al-Balaghah)
 Technical Master/PhD in Arabic literature (science of poetry)
 Technical Master/PhD in Arabic literature (reading skills)
 Technical Master/PhD in Arabic literature (conversational skills)
 Technical Master/PhD in Arabic literature (phonetics)
 Technical Master/PhD in Arabic literature (grammar and ,orphology)
 Technical Master/PhD in Arabic literature (translation)
 Technical Master/PhD in Arabic literature (educational technology)
 Technical Master/PhD in Arabic literature (teaching the curriculum)
 Technical Master/PhD in Arabic literature (vocabulary)
 Technical Master/PhD in Arabic literature (curriculum development)

College of Management and Business
 Master of Science/PhD in management (business administration)
 Master of Science/PhD in management (human resources management)
 Master of Science/PhD in administration (personnel management)
 Master of Science/PhD in recruitment administration
 Master of Science/PhD in administration (logistics management)
 Master of Science/PhD in management (project management)
 Master of Science/PhD in management (performance appraisal)
 Master of Science/PhD in management (quality management)
 Master of Science/PhD in management (entrepreneurship)
 Master of Science/PhD in management (organizational behaviour)
 Master of Science/PhD in Islamic finance
 Master of Science/PhD in finance (financial management)
 Master of Science/PhD in finance (investing)
 Master of Science/PhD in finance (insurance)
 Master of Science/PhD in finance (risk management)
 Master of Science/PhD in finance (enterprise risk management)
 Master of Science/PhD in finance (risk modeling)
 Master of Science/PhD in finance (banking)
 Master of Science/PhD in accounting and taxation (auditing)
 Master of Science/PhD in accounting and taxation (financial accounting)
 Master of Science/PhD in accounting and taxation (tax collection)
 Master of Science/PhD in accounting and taxation (behavioral accounting)
 Master of Science/PhD in accounting and taxation (cost management)
 Master of Science/PhD in marketing (customer satisfaction)
 Master of Science/PhD in marketing (relationship marketing)
 Master of Science/PhD in Marketing (marketing services)
 Master of Science/PhD in marketing (quality of service)
 Master of Science/PhD in marketing (e-commerce)
 Master of Science/PhD in marketing (brand management)
 Master of Science/PhD in marketing (tourism and reception)
 Master of Science/PhD in economics (economic development)
 Master of Science/PhD in economics (environmental economics)
 Master's in business administration (course system)
 Master's in Islamic finance

College of Law and International Affairs
 Master's/PhD in law (business law)
 Master's/PhD in law (commercial law)
 Master's/PhD in law (constitutional law)
 Master's/PhD in law (incorporation law)
 Master's/PhD in law (company law)
 Master's/PhD in law (criminal law)
 Master's/PhD in law (Islamic family law)
 Master's/PhD in law (Islamic law system)
 Master's/PhD in law (jurisprudence)
 Master's/PhD in law (property law)
 Master's/PhD in law (juvenile law)
 Master's/PhD in law (child affairs law)
 Master's/PhD in law (contract law)
 Master's/PhD in law (property law)
 Master's/PhD in law (Islamic banking law)
 Master's/PhD in law (Islamic transactions law)
 Master's/PhD in law (partnership law)
 Master's/PhD in law (navigational affairs law)
 Master's/PhD in law (law of torts)
 Master's/PhD in law (Malaysian legal system)
 Master's/PhD in law (public international law)
 Master's/PhD in law (human rights law)
 Master's/PhD in law (ADR)
 Master's/PhD in law (competition law)
 Master's/PhD in law (intellectual property law)
 Master's/PhD in law (administrative law)
 Master's/PhD in international affairs (diplomacy)
 Master's/PhD in international affairs (foreign policy)
 Master's/PhD in international affairs (international human rights)
 Master's/PhD in international affairs (international organization)
 Master's/PhD in international affairs (international political theories)
 Master's/PhD in international affairs (International politics and religion)
 Master's/PhD in international affairs (international relations)
 Master's in the comparative system (courses and research system)

College of Applied Social Sciences
 Master's/PhD in social sciences (psychology)
 Master's/PhD in social sciences (development and child psychology)
 Master's/PhD in social sciences (sociology and cultural studies)
 Master's/PhD in social sciences (ethnology)
 Master's/PhD in social sciences (gender studies)
 Master's/PhD in social sciences (geography)
 Master's/PhD in social sciences (social anthropology)
 Master's/PhD in social sciences (sociology)
 Master's/PhD in social sciences (political science)
 Master's in sports science (athletic leadership)

Journals
 The Arab Journal for Quality Assurance of Higher Education (AJQHI), published in collaboration with the General Secretariat of the Association of Arab Universities
 The International Journal for Talent Development (IJTD), published by the Centre of Talent Development
 The Journal of Social Studies (JSS), published by the faculty of humanities and administrative sciences
 The Journal of Science & Technology (JST), published by the faculty of computing and engineering
 Yemeni Journal for Medical Sciences, published by the faculty of medicine and health sciences

Rankings
University of Science and Technology in Yemen is regarded as a prestigious university in Yemen. In 2022, QS World University Rankings gave it a rank of 131-150 in Arab region.

In Webometrics Ranking of World Universities ranking, it was ranked within the top-two universities in Yemen.

Accreditation
It is accredited by the Association to Advance Collegiate Schools of Business (AACSB).

Notable alumni 
 Tawakkol Karman earned an undergraduate degree in commerce. She was awarded the 2011 Nobel Peace Prize. She is the first Yemeni citizen and first Arab woman to win a Nobel Prize.
 Hamza Abdi Barre, Prime Minister of Somalia

Presidents 
 Dawood Al-Hidabi, 1994–2007
 Abdulfattah Thiyab, 2007–2009
 Hameed M. Aklan, 2009–2020
 Abdulghany Hameed, 2020–present

References

External links 
 Official website

 Science and Technology
Educational institutions established in 1994
1994 establishments in Yemen